State Trunk Highway 133 (often called Highway 133, STH-133 or WIS 133) is a state highway in the U.S. state of Wisconsin. It runs in north–south in south central Wisconsin from near Tennyson to near Lone Rock.

Route description

Starting at US 61/WIS 35 in Tennyson, WIS 133 begins to travel westward along with the Great River Road. After passing through Potosi, both WIS 133 and the Great River Road then traverses southwestward and then westward along the Mississippi River. In Cassville, they intersect WIS 81. They then turn northward after leaving Cassville, passing through North Andover. In Bloomington, they then meet WIS 35 again. This time, the two routes run along WIS 35 before intersecting US 18 north of Patch Grove. At this point, WIS 133 turns east away from WIS 35/GRR. At this point, WIS 133 travels east, running concurrently with US 18.

WIS 133 then branches northward away from US 18 at Mount Hope. After going through elevated terrain, WIS 133 turns northeastward as it meets the south bank of the Wisconsin River. At this point, the route parallels the river, passing through Woodman. In Boscobel, it then meets US 61 for the second time and then runs concurrently with it. It then turns east away from US 61. In Blue River, the route travels in an eastern direction. In Muscoda, it begins to run concurrently with WIS 80. Both briefly travel south before turning eastward again. Just west of Avoca, WIS 80 branches southward away from WIS 133. Then, WIS 133 turns north along WIS 130, crossing the Wisconsin River and going through Lone Rock before intersecting US 14. At this point, WIS 133 ends there while WIS 130 turns west along US 14. WIS 133 as a whole resembles a C-shaped route.

Major intersections

See also

References

133
133
Transportation in Grant County, Wisconsin
Transportation in Iowa County, Wisconsin
Transportation in Richland County, Wisconsin